Ophisaurus incomptus, the plainneck glass lizard, is a species of lizard of the Anguidae family. It is found in Mexico.

This species is known only from the Veracruz moist forests of southeastern San Luis Potosí state. It is known from fewer than five locations, over a total range area of less than 5,000 km2. The species is poorly known and may occur more widely.

References

Ophisaurus
Reptiles described in 1955
Endemic reptiles of Mexico
Veracruz moist forests